Alex Sanchez or Álex Sánchez (Spanish) or Alex Sánchez (Latin America) may refer to:

Alex Sánchez (footballer, born 1930), Costa Rican footballer
Alex Sanchez (author) (born 1957) American teen author
Alex Sanchez (pitcher) (born 1966), American baseball player
Alex Sánchez (boxer) (born 1973) Puerto Rican boxer
Alex Sánchez (outfielder) (born 1976), Cuban baseball player
Álex Sánchez (footballer, born 1989), Spanish footballer
Álex Sánchez (footballer, born 1991), Spanish footballer

See also
 Alexis Sánchez, Chilean footballer
 Alexis Sánchez (athlete), Spanish hurdler
 Alexander Sánchez, Peruvian footballer